A House of Pomegranates is a collection of fairy tales, written by Oscar Wilde, that was published in 1891 as a second collection for The Happy Prince and Other Tales (1888).  Wilde once said that this collection was "intended neither for the British child nor the British public."

The stories included in this collection are as follows:
The Young King
The Birthday of the Infanta
The Fisherman and his Soul
The Star-Child

Influences 
Wilde's fairy tales were heavily influenced by the Brothers Grimm as well as Hans Christian Andersen. Furthermore, some authors such as Anne Markey claim that A House of Pomegranates was influenced by Irish folktales. Christian imagery and aestheticism are also predominant throughout the collection particularly in "The Young King" where they are heavily blended in a manner evocative of Marius the Epicurean. Walter Pater was also a heavy influence on Wilde.

Contents

The Young King
Dedicated to Margaret, Lady Brooke (the Ranee of Sarawak)

"The Young King" tells the story of the illegitimate shepherd son of the recently dead king's daughter of an unnamed country. Being his only heir, the sixteen-year-old is brought to the palace to await his accession. There, he is in awe of the splendor of his new home and anxiously awaits his new crown, scepter, and robe which are soon to be delivered to him for his coronation in the morning.

During the night, he has three nightmares, one for each element of his raiment, showing him where they came from and how they were obtained. The first dream shows a group of starving, haggard peasants - including children - working at looms to weave his robe where they receive little payment or food despite being worked so hard. The second dream shows a group of slaves on a ship where the youngest slave has his ears and nostrils filled with wax and is sent underwater to find pearls for the young King's scepter but dies after finding the best pearl. The third dream is the most elaborate and deals with the source of his new crown's rubies. In it, men excavate a dry riverbed in a tropical jungle, while overlooking them, the god Death tries to bargain with the goddess Avarice for a single grain of her corn. Each time Avarice refuses, Death summons Ague, Fever and Plague to kill one third of her servants, leaving the place devoid of life. Avarice flees in terror and Death leaves to attend to his duties caused by war and famine around the world.

On the coronation day, the Young King refuses the costume brought to him, and makes a crown from a loop of dried briars, a scepter from his shepherd's staff, and wears his threadbare tunic in place of the royal robe. On his way to the cathedral, the nobles rebuke him for bringing shame to their class, the peasants for trying to deprive them of work, and the bishop for foolishly trying to take all the world's suffering upon himself. As he approaches the altar of the cathedral alone and prays, his staff-scepter blossoms with pearly white lilies, his dry briar-crown with ruby-red roses and his robe is coloured gold by the rays of sunlight streaming through the stained-glass windows; the people fall on their knees in reverence, rioting noblemen bow and swear fealty to him and the awestruck bishop declares that a much higher being (God) has officially crowned the young king.

The Birthday of the Infanta

Dedicated to Mrs. William H Grenfell of Taplow Court (Lady Desborough)

"The Birthday of the Infanta" is about a hunchbacked dwarf, found in the woods by courtiers of the King of Spain. The hunchback's father sells him to the palace for the amusement of the king's daughter, the Infanta, on her twelfth birthday.

Her birthday is the only time she is allowed to mingle with other children, and she much enjoys the many festivities arranged to mark it, especially the Dwarf's performance. He dances, as he did in the woods, thoroughly unaware of his audience's laughing at him. She insists on his performing a second time for her after dinner.

The Dwarf mistakenly believes that the Infanta must love him, and tries to find her, passing through a garden where the flowers, sundial, and fish ridicule him, but birds and lizards do not. He finds his way inside the palace, and searches through rooms hoping to find the Infanta, but finding them all devoid of life.

Eventually, he stumbles upon a grotesque monster that mimics his every move in one of the rooms. When the realisation comes that it was his own reflection, he knows then that the Infanta did not love him, but was laughing out of mockery, and he falls to the floor, kicking and screaming. The Infanta and the other children chance upon him and, imagining it to be another act, laugh and applaud while his flailing grows more and more weak before he stops moving altogether. When the Infanta demands more entertainment, a servant tries to rouse him, only to discover that he has died of a broken heart. Telling this to the Infanta, she speaks the last line of the story "For the future, let those who come to play with me have no hearts."

Adaptations
 Der Geburtstag der Infantin (1908), pantomime by Franz Schreker.
 Az infánsnő születésnapja (1913–1916), ballet by Miklós Radnai.
 Der Zwerg (1921), opera by Alexander von Zemlinsky.
 Poisoned Present for Princess (2011) (children's musical by Cynthia Medley and Marian Wood Chaplin).

The Fisherman and his Soul
Dedicated to H.S.H. Alice, the Princess of Monaco

In "The Fisherman and his Soul", a young Fisherman finds a Mermaid and wants nothing more than to marry her, but he cannot, for one cannot live underwater if one has a soul. He goes to his priest, but the priest tells him his soul is his most precious possession, and the soulless mermen are lost. He tries to sell it to merchants, who tell him it is not worth anything. He goes to a witch, who tells him his soul is his shadow, and says how it can be cut away with a viper-skin knife after he dances with her.

After cutting his shadow and soul free from his body, his Soul tells him that the world is cruel and asks to take with him his heart to allay his fears. The Fisherman, however, refuses to give his Soul his heart, because his love needs it, and he sends the Soul away and joins his Mermaid under the sea.

Each year that passed, the Soul comes to the Fisherman to tell him what he has done in his absence. Each year, he travels in a different direction and meets different people from distant cultures, and each time, he comes into the possession of a magical object, but the Fisherman values love greater than everything the Soul tried to tempt him with. He first talks of the Mirror of Wisdom, which is worshipped as a 'God' in the East, then the Ring of Riches from an Emperor who was willing to give his whole treasury to the Soul rather than this after the Soul survived all his attacks.

The third year, the Soul tells the Fisherman about a nearby city where a woman dances barefooted. Deciding that, since it is so near and he could easily come back to his legless Mermaid, he agreed to go with the Soul to see her dance. Rising up from the water, he and his Soul are reunited. Passing through cities on the way, the Soul tells the Fisherman to do things: in the first, he tells him to steal a silver cup; in the second, to beat a child; in the third to kill and rob the man in whose house they were guests. The Fisherman confronted his Soul, who reminds him that he had not given him a heart. The Fisherman tries to cut away his Soul again, but discovers that, once reunited, they could never again be parted.

Returning to the shore, the Fisherman built a shelter near the water and calls the Mermaid daily, but she never came. After years pass, the lifeless body of the Mermaid washes ashore, and the Fisherman held it while the violent waves enveloped him.

The Priest, finding the drowned Fisherman cradling the dead Mermaid, pronounces them accursed and has them buried in an unmarked grave in the corner of a field, and refuses to bless the water as was his intent to do. Three years later, the Priest goes to the flower-covered altar, prepared to give a sermon on God's vengeful wrath, but, for reasons he cannot explain, he cannot do so and instead spoke of God's love. Asking the deacons where the flowers came from, they tell him they came from the corner of the field. The next day, the Priest blesses the water, but the flowers never grew again and the mermen move to a different bay.

The Star-Child
Dedicated to Miss Margot Tennant (Mrs. Asquith)

"The Star-Child" is the story of an infant boy found abandoned in the woods by a poor woodcutter, who pities him and takes him in. He grows up to be exceedingly beautiful, but vain, cruel, and arrogant, believing himself to be the divine child of the stars. He lords   over the other children, who follow him devotedly, and takes pleasure in torturing the forest animals and village beggars alike.

One day, a beggar woman, emaciated, haggard and with bleeding feet, arrives in the village in search of her lost son, who the Star-Child is revealed to be. However, he scorns her and sends her away, and in doing so, is transformed into a loathsome cross between a toad and a snake as a punishment. His followers abandon him, and he sets off to seek forgiveness from his mother. He also repents his cruelty and asks forgiveness from the animals he had tortured.

At length, he comes to a city, where he is captured and sold into slavery. His master, a malevolent sorcerer, treats him cruelly and gives him three tasks which he must complete. First, he sends him to find a piece of white gold hidden in the forest. The Star-Child searches all day, but cannot find it. Upon returning to the city, he sees a rabbit caught in a trap and stops to free him. In gratitude, the rabbit shows him where the gold is and the Star-Child happily takes it. However, returning with the gold, an ailing beggar calls to him that he will surely starve unless he can give him money for food. The Star-Child gives him the piece of gold, and his master beats him and gives him neither food nor water that night.

For the second task, he is told to go find a piece of yellow gold hidden in the forest. Again, the rabbit shows him where it is, and again, the beggar meets him at the gate, and again, the Star-Child gives him the gold. The sorcerer beats him and chains him up.

For the final task, his master tells him that unless he finds the hidden piece of red gold, he will beat him to death. The rabbit shows him where the gold is hidden, and he returns to the city with it. Along the way, he again meets the beggar and gives him the gold, deciding it means more to him than it does to himself.

Upon entering the city, everyone awaits him to crown him the new king, and he discovers the city's present rulers to be his mother, the beggar woman, and his father, the beggar he had given the gold pieces to. At that point also, he is transformed to his former beautiful self. The Star-Child embraces his parents, has the wicked sorcerer banished and endows riches upon his foster father and his family. At the story's end, we are told of his kind, loving, and charitable reign, but that it only lasted for three years, and the king that followed him was cruel and evil.

Adaptations
A short clay animation film based on "The Star Child" was produced in 1994.
Two films based on "The Star-Child" were produced in the Soviet Union:
Звёздный мальчик (1958)
Сказка о Звёздном мальчике (1983) by Leonid Nechayev

See also
 Music based on the works of Oscar Wilde
The Happy Prince and Other Tales

Notes

External links

 
A House of Pomegranates at Internet Archive (scanned books colour illustrated but not with the original version's Ricketts-Shannon illustrations)
A House of Pomegranates at Project Gutenberg (plain text and HTML)
A House of Pomegranates with illustrations by Jessie M. King (HTML)

"Poisoned Present for Princess" (adaptation of "The Birthday of the Infanta") on the Lazy Bee Scripts web site

Irish fairy tales
Irish folklore
1891 short story collections
Fantasy short story collections
Collections of fairy tales
Works by Oscar Wilde
Books adapted into comics